Barrie Russell Jones (4 January 1921, in Silverstream, New Zealand – 19 August 2009, in Tauranga, New Zealand) was a British-New Zealand ophthalmologist, ophthalmic surgeon, and pioneer of preventive ophthalmology.

Biography 
Jones studied physics and chemistry with B.Sc. from Victoria College in Wellington and then medicine with M.B., B.Chir. from the University of Otago in Dunedin, where he specialized in ophthalmology under Rowland Wilson. From 1951 Jones worked in London at the ophthalmology department of Moorfields Eye Hospital and at Moorfields' Institute of Ophthalmology under Stewart Duke-Elder. In 1963 he became a professor of clinical ophthalmology of the University of London at Moorfields' Institute of Ophthalmology, continuing in that professorial chair until 1981.

Jones was one of the world's leading experts on trachoma and made important contributions to its prevention and treatment. He pioneered microsurgery of the lacrimal drainage system and surgery of the eyelids (often deformed by trachoma).

He was a prime mover in a large clinical trial in Nigeria that demonstrated the safely and efficacy of ivermectin in the prevention of blindness from onchocerciasis. He was the author or co-author of 23 books and hundreds of research publications on a wide range of subjects, including keratoconjunctivitis, pemphigoid, dry eye syndromes, and eye infections caused by bacteria, viruses, fungi, amebae, or various forms of parasites.

In 2002, Jones and his wife Pauline left the UK and returned to New Zealand. Upon his death at age 88, he was survived by his wife and four children.

Selected publications
with Chandler R. Dawson & M. L. Tarizzo: Guide to trachoma control in programmes for the prevention of blindness. 1981,

Awards and honours
1985 — CBE
1987 — King Faisal International Prize for Medicine
1990 — Gonin Medal

References

1921 births
2009 deaths
People from Upper Hutt
British ophthalmologists
New Zealand ophthalmologists
University of New Zealand alumni
New Zealand emigrants to the United Kingdom